Bosque La Joya is a forest of San Vicente Department, El Salvador. It lies to the east of Tecoluca and to the west of the Lempa River.

References

Forests of El Salvador
San Vicente Department